In the United States, direct primary care (DPC) is a type of primary care billing and payment arrangement made between patients and medical providers, without sending claims to insurance providers. It is an umbrella term, incorporating various health care delivery systems that involve direct financial relationships between patients and health care providers.

Background
Direct primary care has been promoted by certain groups of physicians as a means for patients to save money on their primary care services, as well as other ancillary-performed services such as laboratory testing, etc.  Often, there are no insurance co-pays, deductibles or co-insurance fees thus avoiding the overhead and complexity of maintaining relationships with insurers. The objective is to provide better free-market competition with access to higher quality care at lower prices.

Under this model, patients may pay a combination of visit fees and/or fixed monthly fees which grant them access to a set of medical services, including same and next-day appointments, which may take the form of office visits and/or house calls.

Typically a direct primary care arrangement is paired with either:  

 a high-deductible health plan, as DPC alone will not cover catastrophic health care such as most surgeries; or  
 a health reimbursement account as the associated tax-benefits can generally be applied to DPC and other medical expense; 

One of the lesser known provisions of the 2010 Patient Protection and Affordable Care Act in the United States can be found in Section 1301 (and amendment Section 10104). This provision allows for direct primary care to compete with traditional health insurance options in the mandated Health insurance exchange when combined with a low cost high deductible plan.

Advantages 
Direct primary care practices do not typically accept insurance payments, thus avoiding the overhead and complexity of maintaining relationships with insurers, which can take as much as $0.10  - $0.20 of each medical dollar spent. Consequently, because direct pay members are usually automatically billed a physicians practice's cash flow can also be improved.

An emerging model of direct primary care involves the medical practice contracting with self-insured (or self-funded) employers who offer the direct primary care option as a means of accessing care for free or drastically reduced office visit fees.  This is also known as onsite health. The employer pays the membership fees on behalf of the employee to the DPC practice directly.  This option usually provides the employee same or next business day access to care.  This allows workers to address evolving health concerns rapidly in order that the condition can be treated more quickly and the number of sick days or days of decreased productivity from illness might be reduced.  Many DPC practices provide phone or email access to providers so that employees or patients may not even need to leave their workplace to seek medical advice.

Another emerging model is partnering with Healthshare plans where fees are sometimes reduced when participating in both a DPC practice and Healthshare plan. Coverage is more complete and affordable though still lacking for certain services depending on both the DPC practice and Healthshare plan.

Criticisms
Opponents of direct primary care models assert that direct primary care is unethical, primarily benefitting providers and not patients.  Proponents of direct primary care models believe that insurance companies as middlemen are unethical, primarily benefitting insurance companies and taking time away from providers.  The US Patient Protection and Affordable Care Act requires that DPC practices offering such services must include in their plans a secondary qualifying health plan (QHP) that covers other hospital services that the DPC provider may not offer if they choose to offer their DPC arrangement in the healthcare marketplace.  Therefore, in cases where the DPC provider has chosen to participate in the healthcare marketplace, the patient would be required to carry and pay for an additional insurance coverage plan for catastrophic and hospital services in addition to the DPC arrangement for primary health care access if he/she purchases this plan from the healthcare marketplace.  It is argued that DPC plans can be more expensive in the long term, since by design none of the payments made to the DPC provider practice are counted towards insurance deductibles because the provider neither accepts insurance nor participates in the submission and management of the insurance claims process, potentially resulting in a higher out-of-pocket catastrophic or hospital services cost to the patient because deductibles would not necessarily have been reached when these services are provided.

See also 
 Consumer-driven health care
 Concierge medicine

References 

Primary care
United States federal health legislation
Healthcare reform legislation in the United States
Medicare and Medicaid (United States)